Empress Wuyuan may refer to:

Empress Yang Yan (238–274), wife of Emperor Wu of Jin
Empress Huyan (Liu Cong's wife) (died 312), empress of Han Zhao